The 2007 Omani Federation Cup was the first edition of a pre-season football competition held in Oman and was also known as Oman FA Cup. The competition started on 10 May 2007 and finished on 24 May 2007.

The competition featured of two groups of 4 teams, with the top two advancing to the semi-final stages.

The competition featured the top eight clubs playing in the top flight in the 2006–07 season.

Group stage

Group A

Group B

Semi finals

Final

External links
Omani Federation Cup 2007 at Goalzz.com

Oman Professional League Cup
2006–07 in Omani football